Tejak (also Romanized as Tachak and Techek) is a village in Gowharan Rural District, Gowharan District, Bashagard County, Hormozgan Province, Iran. At the 2006 census, its population was 223, in 59 families.

References 

Populated places in Bashagard County